Psychotic Reactions and Carburetor Dung: The Work of a Legendary Critic: Rock 'n' Roll as Literature and Literature as Rock 'n' Roll is a collection of essays written by famous rock music critic Lester Bangs. Named for a 1971 article of the same title, it was edited by Greil Marcus and released in 1987, five years after Bangs' death. In his introduction, Marcus explains that, "Perhaps what this book demands from a reader is a willingness to accept that the best writer in America could write almost nothing but record reviews."

The book consists mainly of Bangs' published articles, beginning with his early work for Creem magazine before moving into his later writings as a freelancer for New Musical Express and other publications. Many of his most famous works are present, including the title piece on garage rock band the Count Five and the Troggs-inspired "James Taylor Marked for Death" from his earlier career as well as an acclaimed profile of the Clash and a tribute to Van Morrison's album Astral Weeks from his later years. One chapter of the book is devoted entirely to Bangs' infamous series of interviews with Lou Reed, including "Let Us Now Praise Famous Death Dwarves," while another chapter features unpublished essays and an unfinished novel excerpt, "Maggie May".

Contents

I. Two Testaments 
 Psychotic Reactions and Carburetor Dung: A Tale of These Times
 Astral Weeks

II. Blowing It Up 
 Of Pop and Pies and Fun: A Program for Mass Liberation in the Form of a Stooges Review, or, Who's the Fool?
 James Taylor Marked for Death
 Do the Godz Speak Esperanto?

III. Creemwork--Frauds, Failures, and Fantasies 
 Chicago at Carnegie Hall, Volumes I, II, III, & IV
 Black Oak Arkansas: Keep the Faith
 White Witch
 John Coltrane Lives
 The Guess Who: Live at the Paramount
 James Taylor: One Man Dog
 The Incredibly Strange Creatures Who Stopped Living and Became Mixed-Up Zombies, or, The Day the Airwaves Erupted
 Jethro Tull in Vietnam
 Screwing the System with Dick Clark
 Slade: Sladest
 My Night of Ecstasy with the J. Geils Band
 Johnny Ray's Better Whirlpool
 Barry White: Just Another Way to Say I Love You
 Kraftwerkfeature
 David Bowie: Station to Station

IV. Slaying the Father 
 from Untitled Notes on Lou Reed
 Let Us Now Praise Famous Death Dwarves, or, How I Slugged It Out with Lou Reed and Stayed Awake
 How to Succeed in Torture without Really Trying, or, Louie Come Home, All is Forgiven
 The Greatest Album Ever Made
 from Untitled Notes on Lou Reed

V. Slaying the Children, Burying the Dead, Signs of Life 
 Iggy Pop: Blowtorch in Bondage
 I Saw God and/or Tangerine Dream
 Where Were You When Elvis Died?
 Peter Laughner
 The Clash
 Richard Hell: Death Means Never Having to Say You're Incomplete
 Growing Up True Is Hard to Do
 The White Noise Supremacists
 Sham 69 is Innocent!
 New Year's Eve
 Otis Rush Mugged by an Iceberg
 Thinking the Unthinkable About John Lennon
 A Reasonable Guide to Horrible Noise

VI. Unpublishable 
 Fragments
 from Notes on PiL's Metal Box
 from "All My Friends are Hermits"
 Review of Peter Guralnick's Lost Highway: Journeys & Arrivals of American Musicians
 from Notes for Review of Peter Guralnick's Lost Highway
 from "The Scorn Papers"
 from "Women on Top: Ten Post-Lib Role Models for the Eighties," a book proposal
 from "Maggie May"

VII. Untitled 
 from Untitled Notes

Popular culture books
1987 non-fiction books
Books of music criticism
American essay collections